The 2007 Family Circle Cup was the 35th edition of the Family Circle Cup.  This WTA Tier I Event was held at the Family Circle Tennis Center in Charleston, South Carolina, United States.

Jelena Janković, who had already propelled herself to #2 in the WTA race, consolidated her position with her first win in a Tier I tournament.

Finals

Singles

 Jelena Janković defeated  Dinara Safina, 6–2, 6–2

Doubles

 Yan Zi /  Zheng Jie defeated  Peng Shuai /  Sun Tiantian, 7–5, 6–0

External links
 ITF tournament edition details

Family Circle Cup
Charleston Open
Family Circle Cup
Family Circle Cup
Family Circle Cup